Mineiros do Tietê is a municipality in the state of São Paulo in Brazil. It is situated in the center of the state of São Paulo, near the following cities: Dois Córregos (9 km),  Barra Bonita (13 km),  Jaú (18 km), São Manuel (45 km),  Torrinha (35 km),  Igaraçu do Tietê (15 km),  Lençois Paulista (46 km),  Pederneiras (45 km) and Bauru (82 km). It is located at an altitude of 669 meters, near the Tietê River.

History
In the middle of the 19th century settlers from Minas Gerais came to the area. Therefore, the settlement was initially named Barrio dos Mineiros. Around 1875, a chapel was built and houses sprung up around it. In 1891 the village Capela de Mineiros became a district of the municipality Dois Córregos. In August 1899, it was elevated to town status, and it became an independent municipality with the name of Mineiros. Its name was changed to Mineiros do Tietê (after the Tietê River) in 1944.

References

Municipalities in São Paulo (state)
Populated places established in 1899
1899 establishments in Brazil